Richland Township is a township in Stoddard County, in the U.S. state of Missouri.

Richland Township was erected in 1853, and named for their rich soil.

References

Townships in Missouri
Townships in Stoddard County, Missouri
1853 establishments in Missouri